The following is List of Universities and Colleges in Guangxi.

References
List of Chinese Higher Education Institutions — Ministry of Education
List of Chinese universities, including official links
Guangxi Institutions Admitting International Students
Yulin Normal University- China's University Guide

 
Guangxi